The NWA Worlds Heavyweight Championship is a world heavyweight professional wrestling championship owned and promoted by the National Wrestling Alliance (NWA), an American professional wrestling promotion. The current champion is Tyrus, who is in his first reign.

Although formally established in 1948, its lineage has been traditionally traced back to the first World Heavyweight Wrestling Championship, which traces its lineage to the title first awarded to George Hackenschmidt in 1905. This effectively makes it the oldest surviving wrestling championship in the world.

The title began as a governing body's world championship and has been competed for in multiple major promotions around the world, including Capitol Wrestling Corporation (which seceded from the NWA and became World Wide Wrestling Federation, now WWE), All Japan Pro Wrestling (AJPW), New Japan Pro-Wrestling (NJPW), Total Nonstop Action Wrestling (TNA, now Impact Wrestling), Ring of Honor (ROH), Combat Zone Wrestling (CZW) and the now-defunct American Wrestling Association (AWA), Jim Crockett Promotions (JCP), (later called World Championship Wrestling, WCW), Eastern Championship Wrestling (ECW, later Extreme Championship Wrestling) World Class Championship Wrestling (WCCW), and many other defunct wrestling promotions.

In October 2017, the NWA ceased being a governing body and gradually evolved into a stand alone wrestling promotion with the NWA Worlds Heavyweight Championship as its premier title.

History

Territory era (1948–1985)

With many territorial promotions appearing across the United States, the NWA was formed in 1948 as a professional wrestling governing body. The NWA World Heavyweight Championship was created that same year. Like franchises, these territories had the option of NWA membership. Member promotions had to recognize the NWA World Heavyweight Champion as world champion while retaining ownership of their own promotion and its own top championship. Every year, the NWA World Heavyweight Champion would travel to each territory and defend the title against the territories' top contender or champion. The purpose of the world champion was to make the top contender look good and still hold the title. The NWA Board of Directors, composed mostly of territory owners, decided when the title changed hands via a vote.

By the late 1950s, however, the system began to break down. As Lou Thesz continued to hold the title, other popular wrestlers such as Verne Gagne became frustrated over the lack of change. There were also disputes over the number of appearances the champion would make in different regions.
	
On June 14, 1957 in Chicago, Thesz defended the world title against Canadian wrestler Édouard Carpentier in a two out of three falls match. Thesz and Carpentier split the first two falls. In the third fall, Thesz was disqualified by referee Ed Whalen who raised Carpentier's hand in victory. The NWA later voided the title change based on the disqualification. Thesz defeated Carpentier by disqualification in a Montreal rematch on July 24. It had been planned that the NWA would present Thesz and Carpentier as rival champions in different cities following a similar pattern to the successful title dispute matches between Thesz and Leo Nomellini. Carpentier would also be able to make appearances in the US as champion while Thesz was on an overseas tour. However, as a result of various disputes within the NWA, Carpentier's manager, wrestling promoter Eddie Quinn, left the organization in August making Carpentier unavailable to the NWA. The organization dealt with the situation by announcing 71 days after Carpentier's win in Chicago that it did not recognize Carpentier's win and had never recognized it. Quinn started promoting Carpentier as the true NWA world champion based on the match with Thesz. In 1958, Quinn started shopping Carpentier around to promoters interested in leaving the NWA. A victory over Carpentier could give a local champion a credible claim to the world championship of wrestling.

Verne Gagne, who had been trying to become NWA World Heavyweight Champion for some time, defeated Carpentier in Omaha, Nebraska on August 9, 1958. This was recognized as a title change by those NWA affiliate promotions that would later evolve into the American Wrestling Association (AWA) in 1960. This disputed version of the NWA World Heavyweight Title was later known as the World Heavyweight Championship (Omaha version). The title was unified with the AWA World Heavyweight Championship on September 7, 1963.

The Boston NWA affiliate known as the Atlantic Athletic Commission arranged a match between Killer Kowalski and Carpentier in 1958. Kowalski's victory created what was after known as the ACC World Heavyweight Title and later the Big Time Wrestling (Boston) World title.

	
The "Crown" version of the championship belt debuted in 1959.

The NAWA/WWA in Los Angeles recognized Carpentier as NWA champion in July 1959 as part of gradually splitting from the NWA. On June 12, 1961, Carpentier lost a match to Freddie Blassie which created the basis for the WWA World Heavyweight Championship (Los Angeles version). The title ceased to exist when the WWA returned to the NWA on October 1, 1968.

The World Wide Wrestling Federation (WWWF), which later evolved into today's WWE, was the major wrestling promotion in the northeast United States in the early 1960s. Vincent J. McMahon's Capitol Wrestling Corporation, the precursor to the WWWF, seceded from the NWA for a variety of reasons including the selection of the NWA World Heavyweight Champion and the number of dates wrestled by the champion in the promotion. Ostensibly, the dispute was over "Nature Boy" Buddy Rogers losing the NWA World Heavyweight Championship to Lou Thesz in one fall instead of a best-of-three; the format in which NWA World Heavyweight Championship matches were traditionally decided at the time. Capitol Wrestling Corporation executives held majority control over the NWA board of directors at the time. Following Lou Thesz's World Heavyweight Championship win, Capitol Wrestling Corporation seceded from the NWA and became the World Wide Wrestling Federation. "Nature Boy" Buddy Rogers was then recognized as the first WWWF World Heavyweight Champion.

The "Ten Pounds of Gold" (aka "Domed Globe") version of the championship belt debuted on July 20, 1973, having been first presented to Harley Race by then-NWA President Sam Muchnick.

When Ric Flair won the NWA World title in 1981, he traveled to other NWA territories and defended the belt. He would drop the belt and regain it, as the NWA board of directors decided. On more than one occasion, Flair lost and regained the belt without the official sanctioning of the NWA. In most cases (such as the case of Jack Veneno), these "switches" are ignored. However, by the late 1990s, the NWA recognized the Flair-Race switches that had occurred in March 1984 in New Zealand and Singapore.

Jim Crockett Promotions (1985–1988)

By early 1985, Jim Crockett Promotions (JCP) controlled many NWA territories and limited championship matches to performers under contract with JCP thus making the title exclusive to the promotion.

The Big Gold Belt version of the NWA World Heavyweight Championship belt debuted on February 14, 1986, at a Championship Wrestling from Florida card called "Battle of the Belts II" where NWA World Heavyweight Champion Ric Flair defended the title against Barry Windham.

It was during this time JCP made a failed bid to go national and almost filed for bankruptcy in an attempt to compete with the WWF. Turner Broadcasting purchased the company, because it was a high rated program on the WTBS cable station. Completing the deal in November 1988, Turner began changing the company to World Championship Wrestling (WCW) under a partnership with the NWA and continued promoting the NWA World Heavyweight Champion Ric Flair.

World Championship Wrestling (1988–1993)
WCW stayed in the NWA, but Turner slowly phased out the NWA name. The NWA organization existed only on paper at this point; on television, it was portrayed that the NWA World Heavyweight Championship simply became the WCW World Heavyweight Championship by late 1990.

Due to a falling out with WCW Executive Vice-President Jim Herd, Flair was fired from WCW on July 1, 1991, while still being recognized as the NWA World Heavyweight Champion. Flair took the NWA belt with him because WCW and Herd had not returned the $25,000 bond Flair had paid on the belt. A match was held for the vacated WCW World Heavyweight Championship within two weeks of the departure, but no mention was made of the NWA title. Flair was stripped of the NWA World Heavyweight Championship by the NWA Board of Directors shortly after he signed with the WWF in September 1991; a board had to be reconstituted, as most members had gone out of business or been bought out by JCP/WCW. Flair displayed the "Big Gold Belt" on WWF television, calling himself the "Real World's Heavyweight Champion." After winning the WWF Championship, the "Real World's Heavyweight Champion" angle was dropped. WCW, which had subsequently filed a lawsuit against the WWF to prevent them from using the Big Gold Belt on television, eventually dropped the action. The NWA World Heavyweight Championship belt was returned to WCW.

During Flair's departure from WCW, the company had made a new WCW World title belt. In October 1991, it was reported by Wrestling Observer that a tournament to determine a new champion was supposed to take place on November 11 at the Mid-South Coliseum in Memphis at a television taping, which also would've began a cross-promotion deal between WCW and the United States Wrestling Association. After the information was leaked (which resulted in Paul E. Dangerously getting suspended for 20 days and removed from color commentary on WCW Saturday Night), the tournament, TV taping and the proposed WCW/USWA cross-promotion deal was immediately cancelled.

In July 1992, the NWA board authorized WCW and New Japan Pro-Wrestling to hold a tournament to decide a new NWA World Heavyweight Champion using the Big Gold Belt, now owned by WCW. Turner's company still maintained its WCW World Championship, thus having two World Heavyweight titles present in the same promotion. The tournament was won by Japanese wrestler Masahiro Chono. From 1992 to 1993, the NWA belt was defended in Japan and on WCW television. Flair returned to WCW and regained the belt from Barry Windham in July 1993; that same year, WCW recognized the Ric Flair-Tatsumi Fujinami NWA title changes in 1991. Disputes between WCW management and the NWA Board reached the breaking point in the summer of 1993 over a variety of issues, not the least of which was a storyline by WCW to have the title switched to Rick Rude.

On September 1, 1993, WCW withdrew their membership from the NWA but kept the title belt which they owned. A court battle decided that WCW could not continue to use the letters NWA to describe or promote the belt, but it did possess a right to the physical title belt and its historical lineage by a signed agreement between the previous NWA president and WCW. Per this ruling, the title belt dropped the recognition as being the NWA World Heavyweight title but continued to be billed as the World Heavyweight Championship by WCW. Soon after, the Big Gold Belt was defended without any company affiliation, even being referred to as the Big Gold Belt for a short time, until it became known as the WCW International World Heavyweight Championship. This title was recognized as the championship of a fictitious entity known as "WCW International", which served as a replacement for the NWA Board until the title was unified with the main WCW title on June 23, 1994.

ECW, WWF and the independent circuit (1993–2002)
Despite losing WCW as its flagship program, the NWA picked up new members and remained in existence as a governing body. After nearly a year, the organization scheduled a tournament to crown a new champion and brought back the "Ten Pounds of Gold" (aka “Domed Globe”) belt to represent this new champion.

By 1994, NWA's Eastern Championship Wrestling (ECW) territory became the most televised wrestling show. The NWA decided to hold a NWA World Title Tournament for the vacated NWA World Heavyweight Championship through ECW at the ECW Arena in August 1994, which was won by Shane Douglas. After the match, Douglas threw the NWA World Heavyweight Championship belt down and picked up the ECW Heavyweight Championship belt, proclaiming himself ECW champion. Almost immediately thereafter ECW withdrew from the NWA and became Extreme Championship Wrestling.

Despite this blow to the organization, the NWA held another tournament three months later in Cherry Hill, New Jersey, hosted by promoter Dennis Coralluzzo and Smoky Mountain Wrestling owner Jim Cornette. Chris Candido won this tournament and the title was recognized and defended in territories such as Smoky Mountain Wrestling and the United States Wrestling Association. Candido held the belt for a few months before dropping it to Ultimate Fighting Championship's (UFC) Dan Severn in February 1995. Severn held the belt continuously for four years, but only made sporadic defenses due to his UFC commitments. Although Severn had attempted to go the "traveling champion" route done by former champions Thesz, Dory Funk, Jr., Harley Race, and Terry Funk, the competition level was relatively minor due to the lack of strong territories.

It was during this time, Severn had a customized NWA World Heavyweight Championship belt made exclusively for him.

In 1998, Dan Severn became part of Jim Cornette's NWA faction in the WWF. Trying to get back in the national spotlight, the NWA made a deal with Vincent K. McMahon to appear on WWF television. Part of Cornette's NWA stable was NWA North American Champion Jeff Jarrett, winning the vacant title by defeating Barry Windham on Monday Night Raw. The NWA's deal with the WWF never accomplished its intended purpose and McMahon ended it. The NWA belt went back to being defended on the independent circuit and remaining NWA territories.

In 1999, Severn lost the title to former Olympic judoka Naoya Ogawa, and the title picture became slightly more competitive. The champions nonetheless remained wrestlers from independents, regardless of whether they were from North America (Severn, Mike Rapada, Sabu), Asia (Ogawa, Shinya Hashimoto), or Europe (Gary Steele). The situation continued until early 2002, when Severn was able to regain the title from Hashimoto in Japan, albeit with controversy.

Total Nonstop Action Wrestling (2002–2007)

In June 2002, Jeff and Jerry Jarrett formed NWA:Total Nonstop Action (NWA:TNA; now known as Impact Wrestling). The Jarretts worked out a licensing deal with the NWA and affiliated their promotion with the NWA World Heavyweight and NWA World Tag Team titles. While working out a cable deal, the Jarretts put NWA:TNA on weekly pay-per-view. The NWA World Heavyweight Champion at the time, Dan Severn, was unable to appear on the inaugural TNA card, and he was stripped of the NWA title. Ken Shamrock was then declared the new NWA World Heavyweight Champion after winning a Gauntlet for the Gold battle royal. In 2004, NWA:TNA withdrew from the NWA, dropping the NWA from their promotion name to just TNA. However, TNA retained the rights to use the NWA World Heavyweight and Tag Team titles until May 13, 2007, when the agreement ended, with TNA creating its own world and tag team championships. 

During this agreement Jarrett held the title more often with six reigns, followed by AJ Styles, Ron Killings and Christian Cage with two reigns each. A brief change that took place in an IWA-PR show, where Ray González pinned Jarrett before being stripped in the same show, later became the first chronologically recognized reign for a Latin American wrestler when it was recognized years later by the NWA (with Jack Veneno and Carlos Colón, Sr. remaining unrecognized).

Return to the independent circuit (2007–2017)

On May 22, 2007, the NWA announced a tournament, entitled Reclaiming the Glory, to fill the title vacancy left after the end of the NWA's relationship with TNA Wrestling. Sixteen men competed for the championship, with Adam Pearce winning the belt by defeating Brent Albright on September 1, 2007, in Bayamón, Puerto Rico. Pearce was active in defending the championship but suffered from the same problems that had plagued the "new" NWA in the past: a lack of stable promotions within the NWA made it difficult to have a traveling champion, so most of Pearce's defenses took place in the NWA Pro promotion owned by David Marquez and John Rivera.

On June 7, 2008, at the Ring of Honor (ROH) pay per view, Respect is Earned II, Pearce revealed the NWA World Heavyweight Championship at the conclusion of his match, making it officially recognized in ROH.

On October 25, 2008, Blue Demon Jr. became the first Mexican professional wrestler, as well as first masked luchador, to win the NWA World Heavyweight Championship when he defeated champion Adam Pearce in Mexico City.

In early-to-mid-2012, Colt Cabana and Adam Pearce began facing each other in a series of matches dubbed the "Seven Levels of Hate" best of seven series. The fourth match of the series was a two-out-of-three falls contest held on July 21, 2012, in Kansas City, Missouri. The NWA sanctioned the match as a world championship match and Pearce emerged victorious to become a five-time world champion. Both wrestlers were tied at three matches apiece when the NWA underwent another major change.

In August 2012, International Wrestling Corp, LLC, a holding company run by Houston-based attorney and wrestling promoter R. Bruce Tharpe, sued the NWA, two of its recent Executive Directors (Robert Trobich and David Baucom) and its then-parent company, Pro Wrestling Organization LLC, claiming insurance fraud regarding the NWA's liability insurance policy. A settlement was negotiated that transferred the rights to the NWA from Pro Wrestling Organization LLC to International Wrestling Corp, LLC. After 64 years, the new organization moved from a membership model to a licensing model, licensing the NWA brand name to wrestling promotions which caused many promotions to immediately cut ties with the NWA, including some of the biggest promotions that had been hosting NWA matches since 2007.

With both Cabana and Pearce even at three victories in their “Seven Levels of Hate” series, the final match was scheduled for October 27, 2012, in Melbourne, Australia, at an NWA Warzone Wrestling event. Pearce wanted the NWA to sanction the match as a world title match, as they had done earlier. The NWA, however, refused to do this and did not want Pearce and Cabana to go forward with the match. They did anyway, with Cabana winning the match. Pearce and Cabana both broke kayfabe after the match, with Pearce saying that Cabana was the rightful champion and Cabana saying that he did not want the title as it was about the past and he was about the future. Pearce declared he did not want the title either and left it in the ring as the two exited the arena.

Lightning One (2017–present)
On May 1, 2017, William Patrick Corgan's company, Lightning One, Inc., purchased the National Wrestling Alliance (NWA), including its name, rights, trademarks, and championships. Corgan's ownership took effect on October 1, 2017. At that point, all existing NWA affiliation agreements were ended and all NWA championships, except the NWA World Heavyweight Championship (renamed the NWA Worlds Heavyweight Championship) and the NWA World Women's Championship, would be vacated in the months following the acquisition. 

On October 20, 2017, the NWA debuted the YouTube series, Ten Pounds of Gold, focused primarily around the NWA Worlds Heavyweight Champion at the time Tim Storm, chronicling his travels across the United States, and defending the championship. As a governing body, the NWA worked collaboratively with various promotions to sanction championship matches.

On December 9, 2017, Nick Aldis won the championship on a Combat Zone Wrestling show. Since the championship change, Ten Pounds of Gold focused on "The Aldis Crusade", a series of 20 title defenses over the course of 60 days in the spring of 2018 and concluding with a title defense against Colt Cabana in Wenzhou, China.

Ten Pounds of Gold, together with the Being The Elite web series produced by the Young Bucks, then focused on the build towards a championship match between Aldis and Cody as part of the All In supercard event on September 1, 2018, where Cody would win the match and the championship. Ten Pounds of Gold continued to cover subsequent defenses at the NWA 70th Anniversary Show, the NWA New Year's Clash pop-up event, and the Crockett Cup 2019.

By July 2019, the NWA would begin to transition into a singular wrestling promotion with the announcement of television tapings in Atlanta for a new weekly series, later announced to be titled NWA Power where the NWA Worlds Heavyweight Championship would be occasionally defended.

During the October 15, 2019 episode of NWA Power, it was announced that they would be holding a pay-per-view called Into the Fire on December 14, 2019. This would be the first pay-per-view event produced exclusively by the NWA without another promotion or production company’s involvement.

Belt designs
There have been six belt designs used to represent the NWA Worlds Heavyweight Championship.

1948-1949: The first design was only held by the very first NWA Worlds Heavyweight Champion, Orville Brown, who suffered a career ending injury resulting from a motorcycle crash in late 1949. This belt consisted of one metal plate with a picture frame at the center. It had gemstones of various sizes around the edges of the belt, with the center featuring larger stones. The belt was retired after the accident, and it remains with Brown's family.

1949–1959: The second design is often referred to as the "Lou Thesz Belt." A leftover from Thesz's reign as Association champion, it consisted of more plates than a leather strap. The main plate had a royal crown, a wrestling ring, and a five-pointed star in a vertical alignment, top to bottom down the center. An alternate design was given to Rikidōzan when he defeated Thesz in 1958 to claim the NWA International Heavyweight Championship, which Rikidōzan in turn held until his death in 1963. In 1992, Thesz lent the original belt to UWFi to represent their World Heavyweight Championship. Nobuhiko Takada and Super Vader were the only ones to hold the belt, until Thesz withdrew from UWFi in 1995 due to his disagreement over co-promoting with New Japan Pro-Wrestling, and took the belt with him.

1959–1973: The third design is sometimes referred to as the "Crown Belt." It had a prominent royal crown at its top, a globe underneath it, and the letters "NWA" horizontally across the center behind two wrestling figures. The design was later used for the NWA United National Championship, the Japanese version of the NWA North American Tag Team Championship and the current version of the NWA World Junior Heavyweight Championship.

1973–1986, 1994–present: The fourth design is commonly referred to as the "Ten Pounds of Gold" (aka “Domed Globe”). It is the design most commonly identified with the title. It has also been referred to on Championship Wrestling from Hollywood, NWA Power, and other NWA media as "Sweet Charlotte", the nickname coined by Adam Pearce in 2008 as a nod to the hometown of Ric Flair, the belt's most famous holder. The original "Ten Pounds of Gold" belt was made in 1973 by an unidentified jeweler in Mexico (similar belts were made for the Mexican-based World Light Heavyweight, Middleweight and Welterweight titles) and featured the flag of the country, as well as those of the United States, Canada, Australia, and Japan. The belt originally had a red suede/velvet strap along with a nameplate (the first world championship belt to incorporate this). The nameplate was only used once, by Jack Brisco, before it was removed from the design. The red leather strap was replaced with a black laced leather strap soon into Brisco's reign due to the material lacking durability. The second side plate on the left side of the belt features a modified version of the older Canadian Red Ensign rather than the official Canadian flag, the Maple Leaf, which had been adopted in 1965. It was retired in 1986. Ric Flair retained possession of the original belt. It is currently located at WWE's Connecticut headquarters. This design was revived in 1994 with a new belt that continues to represent the NWA Worlds Heavyweight Championship in present day. In 2021, they replaced the Australian flag side plate with the United Kingdom flag side plate, with the help of then-champion Nick Aldis. The Mexican-based championship belts featured the flag of Mexico in the front plate instead of the U.S. flag. From 1995 to 1997 the NWA World Junior Heavyweight Championship also had a Ten Pounds of Gold design, as part of the J-Crown, with the U.S. flag in front.

1986–1993: The fifth design is commonly referred to as the "Big Gold Belt." In 1985, Jim Crockett Jr. of Jim Crockett Promotions commissioned Charles Crumrine, a silversmith in Reno, Nevada specializing in rodeo-style belt buckles, to produce the new design. The belt made its debut in February 1986. When WCW left the NWA in 1993, the Big Gold Belt continued serving as the WCW International World Heavyweight Championship, then the WCW World Heavyweight Championship (which it is most commonly known for), and eventually as the World Heavyweight Championship in WWE. Also in WWE, the Big Gold Belt was used in tandem to represent the then-Undisputed WWF Championship after the former WCW Championship was unified with the then-WWF Championship in 2001, and then again in tandem to represent the WWE World Heavyweight Championship after the World Heavyweight Championship was unified with the WWE Championship in 2013. The Big Gold Belt was eventually retired in August 2014.

1995–1999: The sixth design was a customized belt commissioned for Dan Severn during his first reign as NWA World Heavyweight Champion.

Reigns 

The NWA currently recognizes 101 individual World Heavyweight Championship reigns.

The inaugural champion was Orville Brown. The longest reigning champion is Lou Thesz, who held the title from November 27, 1949 to March 15, 1956, for a total of 2,300 days (6 years, 3 months, and 16 days); Thesz also holds the record for longest combined reign at 3,749 days. Shane Douglas is the shortest reigning champion with less than 1 day. Ric Flair holds the record for most reigns with 10. The youngest champion is Chris Candido who won the title at the age of 22, while the oldest champion is Tim Storm, who won it at the age of 51. Sting would win the championship 16 years apart which would be the longest to regain the title, capturing it in WCW then later in TNA.

Tyrus is the current champion in his first reign. He defeated previous champion Trevor Murdoch and Matt Cardona in a three-way match at Hard Times 3 on November 12, 2022, in New Orleans, Louisiana.

References

External links 
Official NWA website
Official NWA YouTube channel
Official NWA Facebook page

Impact Wrestling championships
Jim Crockett Promotions championships
National Wrestling Alliance championships
World Championship Wrestling (Australia) championships
World Championship Wrestling championships
World heavyweight wrestling championships
World professional wrestling championships